The men's 400 metres hurdles at the 2017 World Championships in Athletics was held at the London Olympic Stadium on .

Summary
Karsten Warholm led the final from start to finish. At the final hurdle, Abderrahman Samba, in second place and seemingly gaining on Warholm, stumbled and struggled to maintain his balance, dropping to seventh. From the last hurdle to the finish line Warholm increased his speed again, winning by a comfortable margin, while Yasmani Copello overtook Kerron Clement on the final run in to gain silver.

Records
Before the competition records were as follows:

The following records were set at the competition:

Qualification standard
The standard to qualify automatically for entry was 49.35.

Schedule
The event schedule, in local time (UTC+1), is as follows:

Results

Heats
The first round took place on 6 August in five heats as follows:

The first four in each heat ( Q ) and the next four fastest ( q ) qualified for the semifinals. The overall results were as follows:

Semifinals
The semifinals took place on 7 August in three heats as follows:

The first two in each heat ( Q ) and the next two fastest ( q ) qualified for the final. The overall results were as follows:

Final
The final took place on 9 August at 20:34. The results were as follows (photo finish):

References

400
400 metres hurdles at the World Athletics Championships